

Administrative and municipal divisions

References

Tomsk Oblast
Tomsk Oblast